The Zaku is a fictional model of mecha from the Gundam franchise. It may also refer to:

 Zaku (video game), a 2009 horizontal shooter for the Atari  Lynx by Super Fighter Team
 Alhassan Bako Zaku, Nigerian politician
 Zaku Abumi, a character in the Naruto franchise
 Zakho, whose Aramaic name is "Zaku"
 Chaldean Catholic Eparchy of Amadiyah and Zaku, a diocese of the Chaldean Church

See also 
 Zakho (disambiguation)
 Mar Zaku, a Zoroastrian god